Pasquale Muto (born 24 May 1980 in Naples) is an Italian former cyclist.

Major results

2002
 4th Trofeo Piva
2003
 1st Ruota d'Oro
2004
 7th GP Città di Camaiore
2005
 4th GP du canton d'Argovie
 9th Overall Route du Sud
2006
 2nd Trofeo Matteotti
2007
 1st Stage 8 Tour of Bulgaria
 3rd Memorial Marco Pantani
 4th Giro del Mendrisiotto
 7th Overall Route du Sud
 9th Trofeo Laigueglia
 10th Overall Tour de Slovénie
2008
 3rd Trofeo Matteotti
 6th Giro del Veneto
 6th Giro del Mendrisiotto
 8th GP Città di Camaiore
 9th Coppa Placci
 9th Overall Route du Sud
2009
 3rd Overall Tour of Slovakia
1st Stage 1
 3rd Giro dell'Appennino
 5th Overall Brixia Tour
 7th Overall Tour du Gévaudan Languedoc-Roussillon
 7th Coppa Agostoni
 7th GP Nobili Rubinetterie
 8th Giro di Toscana
 8th Giro del Friuli
 9th Overall Giro di Sardegna
 9th Trofeo Laigueglia
2010
 2nd Overall Course de la Solidarité Olympique
 4th Overall Route du Sud
 5th Subida al Naranco
 7th Trofeo Matteotti
 7th Giro dell'Appennino
 9th Memorial Marco Pantani
2011
 5th Giro dell'Appennino

References

1980 births
Living people
Italian male cyclists
Sportspeople from Naples
Cyclists from Campania
21st-century Italian people